These are the team rosters of the nations participating in the women's ice hockey tournament of the 2022 Winter Olympics.

Age and clubs listed as of the start of the tournament, 3 February 2022.

Group A

Canada

Canada's women's hockey team of 23 athletes was named on 11 January 2022. The team consisted of 13 forwards (F), seven on defense (D) and three goaltenders (G).

Head coach : Troy Ryan

Finland

The roster was announced on 20 January 2022.

Head coach: Pasi Mustonen

ROC

A 23-player roster was announced on 24 January 2022. The roster submitted in the ROC's preliminary application on 2 February featured only nineteen players. Due to positive COVID-19 test results, previously named goaltender Diana Farkhutdinova, defencemen Angelina Goncharenko and Yekaterina Nikolayeva, and forwards Liudmila Belyakova and captain Olga Sosina were removed and reserve forward Polina Luchnikova was added to the roster. Goaltender Valeria Merkusheva and defenceman Maria Batalova were expected join the team in Beijing on 3 February. On 3 February, defenceman Yulia Smirnova and forward Landysh Falyakhova were registered and, on 5 February, Maria Batalova was registered and both Angelina Goncharenko and Olga Sosina returned to the official roster.

Head coach: Yevgeni Bobariko

Switzerland

The roster was announced on 14 January 2022.

Head coach: Colin Muller

United States

The roster was announced on 2 January 2022.

Head coach: Joel Johnson

* Missed the remainder of the tournament after a knee injury in the first preliminary round game on February 3.

Group B

China

The roster was announced on 28 January 2022.

Head coach :  Brian Idalski

Czech Republic 

The roster was announced on 13 January 2022.

Head coach: Tomáš Pacina

Denmark

The roster was announced on 10 January 2022.

Head coach:  Peter Elander

Japan

The roster was announced on 8 January 2022.

Head Coach: Yuji Iizuka

Sweden

The roster was announced on 19 January 2022. Before travelling to Beijing, selected players Emmy Alasalmi, Sara Grahn, Linnea Hedin and Hanna Olsson tested positive for COVID-19 and were replaced by Linnéa Andersson, Paula Bergström, Linn Peterson, and Agnes Åker.

Head Coach: Ulf Lundberg

References

rosters
Lists of competitors at the 2022 Winter Olympics
2022